The 2010 American Le Mans Northeast Grand Prix was held at Lime Rock Park on July 24, 2010. It was the fifth round of the 2010 American Le Mans Series season.

Qualifying
The qualifying session saw David Brabham give Highcroft Racing another overall pole. Christophe Bouchut took LMPC pole for Level 5 Motorsports, Pat Long took the GT pole for Flying Lizard Motorsports and Jeroen Bleekemolen took GTC pole for Black Swan Racing, meaning the Black Swan Porsche has been on GTC pole in all three races they have raced so far.

Qualifying result
Pole position winners in each class are marked in bold.

Race

Race result
Class winners in bold.  Cars failing to complete 70% of their class winner's distance are marked as Not Classified (NC).

References

Northeast Grand Prix
Northeast
Grand